Brodzany is a village and municipality in Partizánske District in the Trenčín Region of western Slovakia.

History
In historical records the village was first mentioned in 1293.

One of the owners – Duke Elimar of Oldenburg, husband of great Russian poet Alexandre Pushkin's niece. Now in Brodzany castle is Pushkin museum.

Geography
The municipality lies at an altitude of 198 metres and covers an area of 18.291 km². It has a population of about 815 people.

Genealogical resources

The records for genealogical research are available at the state archive "Statny Archiv in Nitra, Slovakia"

 Roman Catholic church records (births/marriages/deaths): 1766–1952 (parish B)

See also
 List of municipalities and towns in Slovakia

References

External links

  Official page
https://web.archive.org/web/20071027094149/http://www.statistics.sk/mosmis/eng/run.html
Surnames of living people in Brodzany

Villages and municipalities in Partizánske District